Carmela Bucalo is an Italian politician. She was elected to be a deputy to the Parliament of Italy in the 2018 Italian general election for the Legislature XVIII of Italy.

Career
Bucalo was born on June 27, 1963 in Barcellona Pozzo di Gotto.

She was elected to the Italian Parliament in the 2018 Italian general election, to represent the district of Sicily 2 for the Brothers of Italy.

References

Living people
Brothers of Italy politicians
1963 births
Deputies of Legislature XVIII of Italy
Politicians of Sicily
21st-century Italian women politicians
Women members of the Chamber of Deputies (Italy)